The 2004 NCAA Division I Cross Country Championships were the 66th annual NCAA Men's Division I Cross Country Championship and the 24th annual NCAA Women's Division I Cross Country Championship to determine the team and individual national champions of NCAA Division I men's and women's collegiate cross country running in the United States. In all, four different titles were contested: men's and women's individual and team championships.

Held on November 22, 2004, the combined meet was the first of eight consecutive championship meets hosted by Indiana State University at the LaVern Gibson Championship Cross Country Course in Terre Haute, Indiana.  The distance for the men's race was 10 kilometers (6.21 miles) while the distance for the women's race was 6 kilometers (3.73 miles).

The men's team championship was won by Colorado (90 points), the Buffaloes' second. The women's team championship was also won by Colorado (63 points), the Buffaloes' second. This was the fourth time that the same program won both the men's and women's national team titles (Stanford, 2003; Stanford, 1996; Wisconsin, 1985).

The two individual champions were, for the men, Simon Bairu (Wisconsin, 30:37.7) and, for the women, Kim Smith (Providence, 20:28.5).

Men's title
Distance: 10,000 meters

Men's Team Result (Top 10)

Men's Individual Result (Top 10)

Women's title
Distance: 6,000 meters

Women's Team Result (Top 10)

Women's Individual Result (Top 10)

References

NCAA Cross Country Championships
NCAA Division I Cross Country Championships
NCAA Division I Cross Country Championships
NCAA Division I Cross Country Championships
Track and field in Indiana
Terre Haute, Indiana
Indiana State University